Morphotica is a genus of moths in the family Cosmopterigidae. It contains only one species, Morphotica mirifica, which is found in northern Australia.

References

Cosmopteriginae